In the 10th through 13th centuries, the Lords of Esch (French seigneurs d'Esch) were the holders of the castle of Esch-sur-Sûre in the Ardennes region of Lower Lorraine, then a part of the Holy Roman Empire.

Fredelo
Fredelo (or Frithelo, French Fredelon) (d. between 1083 and 1085), of unknown parentage, was the patriarch of the house of Esch, which produced several notable knights in service of the Crusades. Fredelon's family were likely vassals of Henry III, Count of Luxembourg, and his brother and successor William.

Fredelon was avoué (or vogt) of the abbeys of Malmedy and Echternach, and also known to be their despoiler. Fredelon was an accomplice to Giselbert, Count of Clermont, in a variety of nefarious enterprises.  Fredelon and Giselbert terrorized the region near Nandrin preventing inhabitants from performing even the basic of tasks.  Henri de Verdun, Bishop of Liège, gave this land to Conon, Count of Montaigu, forcing Fredelon and Giselbert to restore the resultant damage.

Fredelon and Giselbert were the lords of castle Clermont in 1095 and engaged in brigandage, although these two regarded their activity as the legitimate levying of tolls on river traffic. Otbert, Henri's successor, organized a siege of the castle but was unsuccessful. A 1095 entry in the chronicle of Giles of Orval reveals that Otbert's objective was ultimately accomplished by purchase, resulting in the enfeoffment of the property to his vassal Lambert, Count of Montaigu.  Giselbert subsequently joined the First Crusade.  It is unclear as to what Fredelon did after his ouster.

Children of Fredelo
Fredelon was married twice.  By his first wife, whose name is unknown, he had two sons:
 Henry of Esch (d. after 1097) (Henricus de Ascha), Crusader with Godfrey of Bouillon
 Godfrey of Esch, Crusader with Godfrey of Bouillon.
Second, Fredelon married Ermengarde, Countess of Clermont, widow of Gozelon, Count of Montaigu.  Fredelon and Ermenrgard had one son:
 Giselbert (d. after 18 March 1131), Count of Esch, who married Aelide, of unknown origin.

It is unclear how Giselbert was to become the Count of Esch and it is not until two generations later that another Count of Esch appears.

Later generations
Giselbert, son of Fredelon, (to distinguish him from Fredelon's accomplice Giselbert, Count of Clermont) had at least one son, Renard (d. after 1157), who was Seigneur de Hermalle-sous-Huy, and had some relationship with Godefroi, Count of Montaigu and Clermont.  He married a woman named Lietgard, daughter of Robert Richira.  They had a son Henri (d. after 1187), also Seigneur de Hermalle-sous-Huy, who witnessed a charter in 1182 regarding a matter involving Conon, Count of Montaigu and Duras.

The next generation also include Godfrey II (Gottfried) (d. 1150 or after), Count of Esch, although it is unclear which of the sons of Fredelon was his father.  He married Alix de Grandpré, widow of Godefroi, Count of Durbuy.  Godfrey and Alix had five children:
 Robert (d. 25 August 1170), Abbé de Foigny
 Heinrich II
 Friedrich
 Bartholomäus von Esch (d. before 1192)
 Ermengarde.

Bartholomäus founded the Priory of Ufeldange in 1182, as described in a charter confirmed by Arnold I of Vaucourt, Archbishop of Trier.  The name of his wife is unknown, but they had two children:
 Godfrey III von Esch (d. after 1182)
 Heinrich III von Esch (d. before 1220)

Heinrich had a son Robert I von Esch (d. between 13 October 1262 and January 1266) who married Ermengarde d’Aspremont (d. after 1271).  Ermengarde was brother to Jean d’Aspremont who was both Bishop of Verdun from 1217-1224  (as John I of Aspremont) and Bishop of Metz from 1224-1238 (as Johann of Aspremont).  Ermengarde's parents were Ida of Chiny, daughter of Albert, Count of Chiny, and Gobert V, Lord of Aspremont.

Robert's son Heinrich IV von Esch appears to have been married to a member of the House of Salm but the precise relationship there is unclear.  His son Godfrey d’Esch was the last member of the House of Esch to appear in historical documents, participating in the Tournament of Chauvency, sponsored by Louis V, Count of Chiny.  Godfrey was championed by his niece Perrine.

Sources 
Murray, Alan V., "The Army of Godfrey of Bouillon, 1096–1099: Structure and Dynamics of a Contingent on the First Crusade" (PDF), Revue belge de philologie et d'histoire 70 (2), 1992
Medieval Lands Project, Herren von Esch (an der Sauer)
Medieval Lands Project, Seigneurs d’Aspremont
Le Long, Nicolas, Histoire Ecclésiastique et Civile du Duché De Luxembourg et Comté de Chiny, Chevalier, 1783 (available on Google Books)
Bretel, Jacques, Le Tournoi de Chauvency, 1285 (manuscripts: Mons MS 330-215 and Oxford MS Douce 308).
Esch-sur-Sûre Castle at Visit Luxembourg

References 

Christians of the First Crusade